George Sandys ( "sands"; 2 March 1578 – March 1644) was an English traveller, colonist, poet, and translator. He was known for his translations of Ovid's Metamorphoses and the Passion of Jesus, as well as his travel narratives of the Eastern Mediterranean region, which formed a substantial contribution to geography and ethnology.

Life

He was born in Bishopsthorpe, the seventh and youngest son of Edwin Sandys, archbishop of York. He studied at St Mary Hall, Oxford in 1589, admitted to Middle Temple, 23 October 1596, and later transferred to Corpus Christi College, Oxford, but took no degree. In 1610, he began his travels through Europe and the Middle East, which culminated in his work The Relation of a Journey begun an. Dom. 1610, in four books.

Sandys also took great interest in the earliest English colonization in America. In April 1621 he became colonial treasurer of the Virginia Company and sailed to Virginia with his niece's husband, Sir Francis Wyatt, the new governor.

When Virginia became a crown colony, Sandys was created a member of council in August 1624; he was reappointed to this post in 1626 and 1628. In 1631, he vainly applied for the secretaryship to the new special commission for the better plantation of Virginia; soon after this, he returned to England for good.

In 1621, he had already published an English translation, written in basic heroic couplets, of part of Ovid's Metamorphoses; this he completed in 1626; on this mainly his poetic reputation rested in the 17th and 18th centuries. Its 1632 edition, featuring extensive commentaries written by Sandys, provided an allegorical reading of Ovid's text. He also began a version of Virgil's Aeneid, but never produced more than the first book. In 1636, he issued his famous Paraphrase upon the Psalms and Hymns dispersed throughout the Old and New Testaments, he translated Christ's Passion from the Latin of Grotius, and, in 1641, he brought out his last work, a Paraphrase of the Song of Songs. He died, unmarried, at Boxley, near Maidstone, Kent, in 1644.

His verse was praised by Dryden and Pope; Milton was somewhat indebted to Sandys's Hymn to my Redeemer (inserted in his travels at the place of his visit to the Holy Sepulchre) in his Ode on the Passion.

Travel and travel writing 

On his travels through Europe and the Middle East, he first visited France; from north Italy he passed by way of Venice to Constantinople, and thence to Egypt, Mount Sinai, Palestine, Cyprus, Sicily, Naples, and Rome. His narrative, was dedicated to Charles, Prince of Wales and formed a substantial contribution to geography and ethnology. Sandys' travel narrative appeared as The Relation of a Journey begun an. Dom. 1610, in four books. This remained a standard account of the Eastern Mediterranean, twice mentioned, for instance, by the English naval chaplain Henry Teonge in his diary of a voyage in 1675.

The writing of The Relation series was influenced by Sandys’ background, as he followed the footsteps of his eldest brother who had previously visited and written about Turkey and the Ottoman Empire. This work contributed to the debates concerning religious tolerance in the early 17th century: Sandys shows that contrary to beliefs of many Western Europeans, multiple religions did not automatically cause social unrest, as exemplified in his descriptions of the Ottoman Empire. Sandys also appears to have been one of the first non-Jewish travelers to refute the belief that Jews "naturally emit an unsavoury odour". The book was well-received in his time, becoming a standard account of the Eastern Mediterranean, although Sandys has later been critiqued for his attitude towards women in his writing by Lady Mary Wortley Montagu.

The seventh edition of The Relation of a Journey begun an. Dom. 1610, in four books combined the four books into a single volume, printed for John Williams junior at The Crown in Little Britain in London, 1673. This compilation volume included Sandys’ travels to all above mentioned locations, the first book containing a history of the state of the Turkish Empire, describing their laws, government, policy, military, justice system and commerce. The first book also included Sandys’ description of the Mohammedan religion (Islam), a description of Constantinople and the manner of living of its sultan, and a study of Greece and Greek religion and customs. The second book of The Relation of a Journey focused on Egypt and the surrounding area. Sandys gives an account of Egyptian antiquity and culture, as well as his voyage on the Nile river. The second book also includes descriptions of Armenia, Cairo, Rhodes, and a brief history of Alexandria, in decline during the time of Sandys’ visitation. His is the last mention of the tomb of Alexander the Great, although it is likely a mere repetition of the description given by Leo Africanus the earlier century. The third book of the series is a description of Palestine, the Holy Land and the Jewish and Christians living there at the time. In the fourth and final volume of the series present in the compilation Sandys Travels, Sandys discusses Italy and describes the islands near it: Cyprus, Crete, Malta, Sicily and the Aeolian Islands. The final volume also includes Sandys’ account of cities and other places of note he visited, amongst which Venice, where his journey began, and Rome. The compilation of these four works, Sandys Travels, includes fifty maps and images.

Theology
Sandys adopted English Arminian theological views that were reflected in his writings. He included anti-calvinist commentaries in his Paraphrase upon the Psalms" (1636). He later translated Christus Patiens (1639) a theological and political drama of Arminian theologian Hugo Grotius.

Family
His brother Edwin Sandys (same name as his father) was a politician and an influential member of the London Virginia Company. George Sandys was an uncle of Richard Lovelace (1618–1657), an English poet in the seventeenth century.

See also

 Lawrence Washington (1602–1653)

Notes and references

Citations

Sources

Extra sources
 This work in turn cites:
 Sandys' works as quoted above.
 Rev. Richard Hooper's edition, with memoir, of The Poetical Works of George Sandys.
 Alexander Brown's Genesis of the United States, pp. 546, 989, 992, 994–995, 1032, 1063.
 Rogers, M.A.(1974). "Books from the Library of George Sandys." The Book Collector 23 no 3 (autumn):361-370.

External links

 
 

1578 births
1644 deaths
16th-century English poets
17th-century English poets
17th-century male writers
Alumni of St Mary Hall, Oxford
Arminian writers
English expatriates in the Ottoman Empire
English male poets